Municipal election in Brno was held as part of Czech municipal elections in 2010. It was a victory for Czech Social Democratic Party (ČSSD). ČSSD formed grand coalition with Civic Democratic Party.

Results

References

2010
Brno municipal election